Leonard Hawthorne Darlot (18 September 1862 – 3 August 1943) was an Australian politician. He was a member of the Western Australian Legislative Assembly from 1900 to 1901, representing De Grey. His brother, Everard Darlot, was also an MP.

References

Obituaries Australia

1862 births
1943 deaths
Members of the Western Australian Legislative Assembly
Place of birth missing
Politicians from Melbourne
20th-century Australian politicians
Australian pastoralists
People educated at Wesley College (Victoria)
Australian racehorse owners and breeders
Australian Officers of the Order of the British Empire